The Chartered Police of Navarre is the autonomous police force for the chartered autonomous community of Navarre in Spain, largely replacing the Spanish Policía Nacional (National Police) and Guardia Civil (Civil Guard). It operates across the Community, and was founded from a traffic police unit set up by the Provincial Council of Navarre in 1929. As of 2020, the Spanish Civil Guard is gradually transferring one of its last competences in Navarre, traffic policing and highways patrolling to the Navarrese autonomous Police, leaving the Civil Guard to specific tasks in this Autonomous Community (as for Catalonia and the Basque Country).

As of 2007, the force had 925 police officers, with medium-term plans to increase that number to about 1,200.

The current sidearm for officers is a Glock Model 19 Gen 3 chambered in 9x19mm which has been in service since before 2010.

Ranks

References

 Fabian Hinrichs: Das Recht der spanischen Vollzugspolizei, Ergon-Verlag 2004

Foral
Government agencies established in 1928
1928 establishments in Spain